Hou Shusen (born June 1950) is a retired general in the People's Liberation Army of China. He was a member of the 12th National Committee of the Chinese People's Political Consultative Conference. He was a representative of the 17th National Congress of the Chinese Communist Party.

Biography
Hou was born in Fuxin Mongol Autonomous County, Liaoning, in June 1950. He served in the Shenyang Military Region since joining the People's Liberation Army (PLA), and eventually becoming its chief of staff in December 2005. He also served as a secretary for Commander Wang Ke between 1992 and 1995. In July 2009, he succeeded Liu Zhenwu as deputy chief of the People's Liberation Army General Staff Department, serving in the post until his retirement in November 2014. In March 2015, he took office as vice chairperson of the Liaison with Hong Kong, Macao, Taiwan and Overseas Chinese Committee of the Chinese People's Political Consultative Conference.

He was promoted to the rank of major general (shaojiang) in 1999, lieutenant general (zhongjiang) in July 2007, and general (shangjiang) in July 2011.

References

1950 births
Living people
People from Fuxin
Jilin University alumni
People's Liberation Army generals from Liaoning
People's Republic of China politicians from Liaoning
Chinese Communist Party politicians from Liaoning
Members of the 12th Chinese People's Political Consultative Conference